Ballance is a 3D puzzle video game for Microsoft Windows. It was developed by German studio Cyparade, published by Atari Europe and first released in Europe on 2 April 2004. The gameplay is similar to Marble Madness: the player controls a ball via mouse and keyboard, moving it along a course while trying not to fall off the screen. The game is now considered abandonware, and neither the developers nor publishers are actively tracking its copyrights.

Gameplay

In the game, the player can change the ball's material with special transformers throughout the game's 13 levels (12 levels originally; another downloadable level, level 13 "Speed", is available on the developer's homepage). It can be transformed into a wood, stone, or paper ball.

The wooden ball is very stable and can be used for several puzzles in the game. The player initially launches into and leaves all levels with a wooden ball.

The stone ball is extremely heavy, and can be accidentally rolled off an edge very easily, but this ball can easily push down boxes and bridges. Furthermore, rolling a stone ball through a bridge made of planks will make the bridge collapse.

The paper ball is very light. Its surface is not smooth, unlike the wooden and stone balls, and so its movement is slightly variable. A paper ball can be blown into the air by ventilators and can roll up steep hills easily.

Two power-ups are available. If the ball rolls into them they provide either an extra ball or extra points. Checkpoints are scattered evenly across levels so that if a player falls off the course they only have to restart the game from the last checkpoint reached.

There are 12 different levels. As the player navigates the ball along a path each become more difficult than the last. On occasion, the player has to push other balls down holes or onto rails to continue rolling along the path. Each level requires the player to complete physical challenges, which often have more than one puzzle to solve. The side-rail is introduced in level 3. The player's ball needs to roll on its side along two rails which are aligned vertically one above the other. In level 12, the player's ball has to balance on the center of the mono-rail, which composed of only one rail.

An additional level 13 called "Speed" and located in Twilight Zone was available for free on the developer's homepage a few months after the release of the game.

Reception

An Adrenaline Vault review by Bob Mandel described the game's graphics as "heavenly", particularly admiring the "exquisite detail". Mandel thought the sounds were "absolutely outstanding", enjoyed the music and thought the gameplay was exciting and intense.

In the late 2010s, the game achieved renewed popularity among users of Bilibili. Concurrently, several studios in China published and marketed copies of the program under different names, including Ballance: The Return.

See also

Neverball
Switchball

References

External links
 Cyparade
 Ballance Developer Homepage – From web.archive.org

2004 video games
Atari games
Marble games
Puzzle video games
Video games developed in Germany
Public-domain software
Windows games
Windows-only games